Springfield Township is one of the sixteen townships of Ross County, Ohio, United States.  The 2000 census found 2,277 people in the township, 2,276 of whom lived in the unincorporated portions of the township.

Geography
Located in the eastern part of the county, it borders the following townships:
Green Township - north
Colerain Township - northeast corner
Harrison Township - east
Liberty Township - southeast
Scioto Township - southwest
Union Township - northwest

No municipalities are located in Springfield Township.

Name and history
It is one of eleven Springfield Townships statewide.

Government
The township is governed by a three-member board of trustees, who are elected in November of odd-numbered years to a four-year term beginning on the following January 1. Two are elected in the year after the presidential election and one is elected in the year before it. There is also an elected township fiscal officer, who serves a four-year term beginning on April 1 of the year after the election, which is held in November of the year before the presidential election. Vacancies in the fiscal officership or on the board of trustees are filled by the remaining trustees.

References

External links
County website

Townships in Ross County, Ohio
Townships in Ohio